Pageau is a French-Canadian surname. People with the surname include:
Jean-Gabriel Pageau (born 1992), Canadian ice hockey player
Paul Pageau (born 1959), Canadian retired ice hockey player
Jean Pageau, singer of Canadian rock band Mystery
Gisèle Pageau, mayor of French River, Ontario